Jeffrey Alan Zimmerman (born January 10, 1965) is an American former college and professional football player who was an offensive lineman in the National Football League (NFL) for four seasons during the late 1980s and early 1990s.  He played college football for the University of Florida, and was twice recognized as an All-American.  The Dallas Cowboys selected him in the third round of the 1987 NFL Draft.

Early years 

Zimmerman was born in Enid, Oklahoma in 1963. He attended Maynard Evans High School in Orlando, Florida, where he played as an offensive tackle and was named high school All-American in 1982.

College career 

He accepted a football scholarship to attend the University of Florida in Gainesville, Florida, where he played for coach Charley Pell and coach Galen Hall's Florida Gators football teams from 1983 to 1986.

As a freshman, he was a backup at guard behind John Hunt. The next year, he became the starter a right guard.

In 1985, although he lost two weeks due to a right knee injury he suffered against Rutgers University, he became the first Gators lineman to be named to an All-American team as an underclassman.

He was nicknamed "One Man Gang" by his teammates and was a two-year starter at right guard, until his senior season when he was moved to right tackle. He excelled at pass protection, despite suffering a pulled groin in mid-season.

Zimmerman was one of the members of the Gators' outstanding offensive line of the mid-1980s known as the "Great Wall of Florida," which included Phil Bromley, Lomas Brown, Billy Hinson and Crawford Ker. Behind their blocking, the Gators' quarterback Kerwin Bell, fullback John L. Williams and halfback Neal Anderson led the Gators to identical 9–1–1 overall win–loss records and best-in-the-SEC records of 5–0–1 and 5–1 in 1984 and 1985, respectively.

Professional career 

He was selected by the Dallas Cowboys in the third round (68th overall) of the 1987 NFL Draft, as part of a change in the offensive line philosophy, when the team started to value size and strength over speed and athletic ability.  Although he was initially projected as a first-round draft choice, the weight problems he displayed as a senior and in the post-season dropped his value.

As a rookie, he was a backup at left guard behind Nate Newton. His only recognition came from knocking All-Pro Lawrence Taylor unconscious during a blitz, in a game against the New York Giants September 20. On October 1, he made his first career start against the Philadelphia Eagles at left guard.

In 1988, a dislocated shoulder he suffered in training camp limited his playing time to one game. He was placed on the injured reserve list on September 23, after re-injuring in the third week of the season. 

In 1989, he was able to play in his only full season, becoming a key backup at guard and tackle, on an offensive line that limited opponents to a then franchise record low 30 sacks. On December 16, he lined up at right tackle to make his second NFL start. He also was used as the third tight end in short yardage situations.

In 1990, he started the first 9 weeks of the year on the injured reserve list with a sprained knee injury he suffered in training camp. He was reactivated on November 7. After sitting out the San Francisco game, he saw action in the final six contests of the season as a backup guard. He also was used as the third tight end in short yardage situations.

During the 1991 off-season without any previous notice, he chose not to attend the Cowboys' conditioning program nor training camp, and was placed on the reserve/did not report list. He announced his retirement from pro football at a later time, after the problems he experienced controlling his weight hampered his performance and cut his career short.

See also 

 1985 College Football All-America Team
 1986 College Football All-America Team
 Florida Gators football, 1980–89
 List of Dallas Cowboys players
 List of Florida Gators football All-Americans
 List of Florida Gators in the NFL Draft
 List of University of Florida alumni

References

Bibliography 

 Carlson, Norm, University of Florida Football Vault: The History of the Florida Gators, Whitman Publishing, LLC, Atlanta, Georgia (2007).  .
 Golenbock, Peter, Go Gators!  An Oral History of Florida's Pursuit of Gridiron Glory, Legends Publishing, LLC, St. Petersburg, Florida (2002).  .
 Hairston, Jack, Tales from the Gator Swamp: A Collection of the Greatest Gator Stories Ever Told, Sports Publishing, LLC, Champaign, Illinois (2002).  .
 McCarthy, Kevin M.,  Fightin' Gators: A History of University of Florida Football, Arcadia Publishing, Mount Pleasant, South Carolina (2000).  .
 Nash, Noel, ed., The Gainesville Sun Presents The Greatest Moments in Florida Gators Football, Sports Publishing, Inc., Champaign, Illinois (1998).  .

External links 
 The Great Wall

1965 births
Living people
Sportspeople from Enid, Oklahoma
Players of American football from Orlando, Florida
All-American college football players
American football offensive guards
American football offensive tackles
Florida Gators football players
Dallas Cowboys players